Jarahi Rural District is a rural district (dehestan) in the Central District of Mahshahr County, Khuzestan Province, Iran. At the 2006 census, its population was 51,358, in 10,424 families.  The rural district has 56 villages.

References 

Rural Districts of Khuzestan Province
Mahshahr County